A dry valley may develop on many kinds of permeable rock, such as limestone and chalk, or sandy terrains that do not regularly sustain surface water flow. Such valleys do not hold surface water because it sinks into the permeable bedrock.

There are many examples of chalk dry valleys along the North and South Downs in Southern England.

Other examples include the Alkham Valley near Dover, and the Hartley Bottom and Fawkham valleys near Dartford in north Kent.

There are many examples of limestone dry valleys in the Peak District and the Yorkshire Wolds. A notable example is the valley of the River Manifold which is dry, except in spate, from Wetton south for several miles.

Many hypotheses have been advanced to explain dry valley development. Some may have developed during periods of higher water table, others in periglacial conditions during which normally permeable bedrock would have been made impervious by permafrost, thus allowing flowing water to erode it.

See also
 McMurdo Dry Valleys

References

External links 

Valleys